Irene Tamborra is the Italian particle astrophysicist, specializing in the areas of neutrino astrophysics and cosmology as well as multi-messenger astronomy. She is professor of particle astrophysics at the Niels Bohr Institute, University of Copenhagen.

Education and career 

Irene Tamborra studied physics at the University of Bari in Italy, she was awarded a Bachelor's of Science in physics in 2005 and a Master of Science in theoretical physics in 2007. She graduated from the University of Bari in 2011 with a Ph.D. thesis in astroparticle physics. She was an Alexander von Humboldt Foundation research fellow at the Max Planck Institute for Physics in Munich from 2011 to 2013, and research associate at the GRAPPA Centre of Excellence of the University of Amsterdam from 2013 to 2015. She joined the University of Copenhagen as Knud Højgaard assistant professor in 2016, was promoted to associate professor in 2017, and full professor in 2021.

Research 

Irene Tamborra’s research focuses on the interface between astrophysics and particle physics. She has offered a number of ideas, concerning the exploration of a wide range of astrophysical objects by using neutrinos as probes, and has played a pioneering role in connecting the theoretical modelling of the microphysics of astrophysical sources to observations within a multi-messenger framework. Irene Tamborra's work has also provided fundamental contributions to our understanding of neutrino flavor conversion in dense media (such as core-collapse supernovae, neutron star merger, and the early universe), the modeling of physics beyond the Standard Model in astrophysical sources, and the nucleosynthesis of the heavy elements. She discovered the lepton emission self-sustained asymmetry (LESA). LESA is the first hydrodynamical instability occurring in core-collapse supernovae completely driven by neutrinos and it consists of an astonishingly large asymmetric emission of electron neutrinos with respect to electron antineutrinos.

Awards

 2020 - Kvinder i Fisik Prize, Danish Network for Women in Physics

 2019 - Shakti P. Duggal Award, International Union of Pure and Applied Physics

 2019 - Merac Prize for the Best Early Career Researcher, European Astronomical Society

 2019 - Carlsberg Distinguished Associate Professor, Carlsberg Foundation

 2011 - von Humboldt Fellow, Alexander von Humboldt Foundation

 2009 - Antonio Stanghellini Award, Italian Physical Society

References

External links

 Faculty webpage of Irene Tamborra at the Niels Bohr Institute

Living people
Italian women scientists
Italian astrophysicists

Year of birth missing (living people)